Queensland Regional Airlines was an airline based in Cairns, Queensland, Australia. It was established and started operations in 2003 and operates passenger services, as well as contract and ad hoc charter and aircraft leasing. Its main base was Cairns International Airport.

History 

The airline was launched by parent company, Australian Aviation Holdings (AAH), headquartered in Cairns, in 2002.

Services 

All Queensland Regional Airlines flights are now operated by Skytrans Airlines after the two airlines were merged by their parent company.

Fleet 

As of December 2006 the Queensland Regional Airlines fleet includes:

4 Bombardier Dash 8 Q100

For several years one aircraft has been on lease to Aircruising Australia during that company's flying season each year. Two different aircraft, VH-QQC and VH-QQE, have been used; currently VH-QQE is in Aircrusing service. These aircraft are now operated by Skytrans Airlines

See also
List of defunct airlines of Australia
 Aviation in Australia

References

External links

Defunct airlines of Australia
Airlines established in 2002
Companies based in Queensland
2002 establishments in Australia